Eremophila psilocalyx is a flowering plant in the figwort family, Scrophulariaceae and is endemic to Western Australia. It is an erect shrub with a broom-like shape, narrow, hooked leaves and white, pink, blue or purple flowers. It is common in the mallee country around Esperance. It was sometimes incorrectly known as Eremophila pachyphylla.

Description
Its branches are glabrous and have raised, warty lumps, and resin secreting glands, making them sticky near their ends. The leaves are arranged alternately along the branches, narrow elliptic to lance-shaped tapering at the lower end, and with a hook at the far end.

The petal tube is white to lilac-coloured, sometimes pink, blue or purple, and white inside with yellow-brown spots. The petal tube and lobes are glabrous apart from the inside of the lower petal lobe and the inside of the tube which have long, soft hairs. The 4 stamens are fully enclosed in the petal tube.

Taxonomy and naming 
The species was first formally described by Ferdinand von Mueller in 1876 and the description was published in Fragmenta phytographiae Australiae. The specific epithet (psilocalyx) is derived from the Ancient Greek ψῑλός (psīlós) meaning "smooth" or "bare" and κάλυξ (kálux) meaning "cup" or "cover" referring to the glabrous sepals.

The species was named Eremophila pachyphylla by Ludwig Diels who was apparently unaware that the species had been described earlier.

Distribution and habitat
Eremophila psilocalyx is a widespread and common species between Lake King and Balladonia in the Coolgardie, Esperance Plains, Mallee and Murchison biogeographic regions where it grows in a range of soils on plains, saltpans and rocky hillsides.

Conservation
This species is classified as "not threatened" by the Western Australian Government Department of Parks and Wildlife.

Use in horticulture
This species is not often cultivated but its prolific flowers, neat shape and the tendency of the colourful sepals to remain on the plant long after flowering make it a suitable species for wider use. It can be propagated from cuttings but may be very slow to strike, taking up to a year to develop roots. It is more easily grown by grafting onto Myoporum rootstock and will grow in most soils in a sunny or part-shaded position. It is very drought tolerant and moderately frost resistant.

References

Eudicots of Western Australia
psilocalyx
Endemic flora of Western Australia
Plants described in 1876
Taxa named by Ferdinand von Mueller